More Human Heart (1997) is the third album released by Acumen Nation, on Conscience Records.

Track listing 
 "Ventilator" (Jason Novak) – 6:01
 "If You Were" (J. Novak) – 3:48
 "Unkind" (J. Novak) – 3:38
 "Cancerine (J. Novak/Ethan Novak) – 3:12
 "Revelations per Minute" (J. Novak) – 4:57
 "Bleed for You" (J. Novak) – 5:37
 "The Funny Thing Is..." (J. Novak/E. Novak) – 5:10
 "Fuck Yer Brains Out" (J. Novak) – 7:07
 "Ugly on the Inside" (J. Novak) – 4:48
 "Punkass" (J. Novak/E. Novak) – 2:44
 "Dreamheart/Crush'd" (J. Novak) – 9:00

Personnel 
 Jason Novak
 Ethan Novak
 Jamie Duffy

References 

1997 albums
Acumen Nation albums